Oblasts of the Russian Empire were considered to be administrative units and were included as parts of Governorates General or krais. The majority of then-existing oblasts were located on the periphery of the country (e.g. Kars Oblast or Transcaspian Oblast) or covered the areas where Cossacks lived.
Former administrative divisions of countries

List 
 Amur Oblast
 Armenian Oblast
 Batum Oblast
 Belostok Oblast
 Bessarabia Oblast
 Don Voisko Oblast
 Dagestan Oblast
 Zabaikalskaya Oblast
 Imeretinskaya Oblast
 Caucasian
 Kamchatka Oblast
 Kars Oblast
 Caspian Oblast (1840-1846)
 Kwantung Oblast
 Kuban Oblast
 Orenburg Kirgiz
 Omsk Oblast
 Primorskaya Oblast
 Sakhalin
 Taurida Oblast (1783-1796), annexation of the Crimean Khanate
 Tarnopolsky
 Terek Oblast
 Turgay Oblast
 Ural Oblast
 Yakut Oblast

 Oblasts of Stepnoy Krai
 Akmolinsk Oblast
 Siberia Kirgiz
 Semipalatinsk Oblast

 Oblasts of Turkestan Krai
 Transcaspian Oblast
 Samarkand Oblast
 Syr-Darya Oblast
 Turkestan Oblast
 Fergana Oblast
 Semirechye Oblast

See also 
 Oblasts of the Soviet Union
 Oblasts of Russia
 Oblasts of Ukraine
 Voblasts of Belarus